Parma is a town in Monroe County, New York, United States. The population was 15,633 at the 2010 census.

The Town of Parma, then in Genesee County, was organized in 1808, named after Parma in Italy.

Geography

The town is bordered on the north by the southern shore of Lake Ontario, on the west by the towns of Hamlin, Clarkson and Sweden, on the south by the town of Ogden and on the east by the town of Greece.

Demographics

As of the census of 2000, there were 14,822 people, 5,283 households, and 4,030 families residing in the town.  The population density was 353.2 people per square mile (136.4/km2).  There were 5,502 housing units at an average density of 131.1 per square mile (50.6/km2).  The racial makeup of the town was 97.08% White, 1.29% African American, 0.18% Native American, 0.52% Asian, 0.03% Pacific Islander, 0.24% from other races, and 0.67% from two or more races. Hispanic or Latino of any race were 1.12% of the population.

There were 5,283 households, out of which 38.7% had children under the age of 18 living with them, 64.1% were married couples living together, 8.4% had a female householder with no husband present, and 23.7% were non-families. 18.9% of all households were made up of individuals, and 6.2% had someone living alone who was 65 years of age or older.  The average household size was 2.77 and the average family size was 3.20.

In the town, the population was spread out, with 28.3% under the age of 18, 6.6% from 18 to 24, 30.2% from 25 to 44, 24.8% from 45 to 64, and 10.0% who were 65 years of age or older.  The median age was 37 years. For every 100 females, there were 98.8 males.  For every 100 females age 18 and over, there were 96.4 males.

The median income for a household in the town was $53,189, and the median income for a family was $60,686. Males had a median income of $42,566 versus $29,381 for females. The per capita income for the town was $22,431.  About 2.2% of families and 4.1% of the population were below the poverty line, including 5.6% of those under age 18 and 5.0% of those age 65 or over.

History

The Town of Parma was established on April 8, 1808 from the town of Northampton, named after Parma, Italy.

Government

The town is governed by a Town Board consisting of a Town Supervisor and four Councilpersons, all elected by registered town voters.

Public school
The Hilton Central School District comprises the majority of the town with the southern portion along the 104 Corridor in the Spencerport Central School District and a southwestern portion in the Brockport Central School District. 
http://www.hilton.k12.ny.us

Communities and locations in Parma
Hilton - village in the northern part of the town
Parma Center
Parma Corners

Notable people
John Baker, U.S. Representative from Indiana and United States federal judge
George Baldwin Smith, Politician
Cathy Turner, American short track speed skater & Two time Olympic Gold Medalist

References

External links

Rochester metropolitan area, New York
Towns in Monroe County, New York
1808 establishments in New York (state)
Populated places established in 1808